Bennie is a surname which may refer to:

 Andrew Bennie (born 1956), New Zealand horseman
 Bob Bennie (1900–1972), Scottish footballer
 Charlie Bennie (1887–1963), Australian rules footballer
 John Bennie (footballer) (1896–?), Scottish footballer
 John Bennie (missionary) (1796–1869), Presbyterian missionary and Xhosa linguist
 Peter Bennie (1898–?), Scottish footballer

See also
 Benny (surname)